Nabak (also known as Wain) is a Papuan language spoken by around 16,000 people in the Morobe Province located in the western Huon Peninsula of Papua New Guinea. Nabak follows the SOV typology. It uses Latin script in its written form.

Classification and language status 
Nabak is sub-grouped into the Trans-New Guinea, Finisterre-Huon, Western, Huon language family. The Expanded Graded Intergenerational Disruption Scale (EGDIS) has the Nabak level 5. A level 5 language is considered as “developing”, meaning that Nabak is thriving but a standardized form is not widespread. Level 1 speakers, or native speakers, on average are about 50 to 75 percent fluent in Nabak. The language is spread throughout approximately 30 settlements, totaling 52 villages in the Busu river east headwaters.

Phonology

Consonants 

Allophones of /kʷ, ɡʷ/ can be heard as [k͡p, ɡ͡b]. Allophones of sounds /s, z, l, w/ can be heard as [t͡s, d͡z, ɾ, β].

Vowels 

Written form: â, a, e, i, o, u

Words

Nouns 
Nouns can be pluralized and/or possessed. If a noun is pluralized, then the possessive noun indicator must also be present. Nouns that are body-parts are typically in the possessive form, unless making an objective statement.

Examples 

 bet  = a hand
 bedi = your hand

 zikat = an eye
  = their (dual) eyes

 kwaŋ = grass
 kwaŋaŋ = his grass
 tunne = my rivers

The structure of nouns

Possessive suffixes

Pronouns 
There are many pronouns in the Nabak language. Formal genitive pronouns are not as widespread there is no direct translation to English third-person pronouns. Formal genitive pronouns only exists in the interrogative form.

First person pronouns

Adjectives 
Adjectives and nouns are part of the same word class in the Nabak Language. This category only serves to illustrate nouns that can modify a head noun. Though, a dilemma occurs because these modifier nouns can also act as the head nouns that they are modifying. It is important to identify when describing ‘adjectives’ in Nabak, what is being described are words that are part of the noun class.

Examples 
Quality: 

 dolak-ŋaŋ = good
 sambubu-ŋaŋ = rotten

Size:

 tembe = big
 isik-ŋaŋ = little

Dimensions:

 teep-maŋ = tall/long
 Da-naŋ = short

Color

 ŋa-maŋ = red
 sat-naŋ = white

Weight

 nuk-ŋaŋ = heavy
 Imbela-ŋaŋ = light

Numbers 

 kwep = one
 zut = two
 tuk = three

(*Note that phrases represent higher numbers*)

Verbs 
Verbs consists of an optional prefix, with a verb stem, then with an optional first-order aspect suffix.

There are medial verbs and final verbs. Final verbs are located at the end of a sentence. Medial verbs can be located anywhere but at the end of a sentence.

Structure of medial and final verbs

Interrogatives 
Polar interrogatives are made from declarative statements simply by changing the vocal intonation so that there is a higher pitch at the end of a sentence. 

Non-polar interrogatives are made by using the words equivalent to “who”, “what”, “when”, “where”, etc.

Emotion and interrogatives 
Interrogatives can also be used to introduce emotion into a story. This is done by the storyteller making the participant in a story ask a question to themselves, letting the listeners of the story what emotion they are dealing with.

References 

Languages of Morobe Province
Huon languages